Jamaludin Badr is the former Governor of Nuristan Province, Afghanistan. He is the successor of Eng. Hazrat Din Noor, who died in a car accident only a few months after he was installed.

According to American officials, relations between the coalition and Jamaluddin Badar broke down over allegations of corruption and months of unpaid police salaries. "We withdraw investment in places we cannot go," said US Navy Commander Russell McCormack. "In one month, we canceled 3.5 million dollars in schools because we could not go to the sites to verify what was happening to the money."

In May 2010 Governor Badr faced accusations of corruption and was prosecuted. The case was referred to the Attorney General and Badr was sentenced to prison for two months.

Notes

Governors of Nuristan Province
Living people
Year of birth missing (living people)
People from Nuristan Province